Incest can be found in many varieties of literature, from popular forms to serious fiction, either as an important thematic element or as an incidental element of the plot. Incest is human sexual activity between family members or close relatives. This typically includes sexual activity between people in consanguinity (blood relations), and sometimes those related by affinity (marriage or stepfamily), adoption, clan, or lineage.

Incestual families in fiction

John Ford's 'Tis Pity She's a Whore play (between 1629 and 1633) is one of the earliest examples that generated much controversy. 
The 120 Days of Sodom (1785), Philosophy in the Bedroom (1795), and Juliette (1797), all written by the Marquis de Sade, are all full of detailed descriptions of incest.
Cousins (1879) by Lucy Bethia Walford, a fictional story of Simon who romances his cousins. The book debates cousin coupling at a time when it was a highly contested topic.
Samuel R. Delany's novel Hogg, written in 1969, is also full of detailed descriptions of incest. According to Paul Di Filippo, Delany sought to push the boundaries of heteronormative sex.
In Gabriel García Márquez's One Hundred Years of Solitude (1967) there are several cases of sex between more or less close relatives, including that which occurs between a nephew and aunt. Other works of literature show consequences not so grave, such as Arundhati Roy's The God of Small Things, in which fraternal twins share a cathartic sexual experience.
Vladimir Nabokov's novel Ada or Ardor: A Family Chronicle (1969) deals very heavily with the incestuous relationships in the intricate family tree of the main character, Van Veen. There are explicit moments of sexual relations primarily between Van and his sister, Ada, as well as between Ada and her younger sister, Lucette. Nabokov does not necessarily deal with any complexities or consequences, social or otherwise, which may be inherent to incestuous relationships—outside of the strictly practical concerns of having to hide the taboo relationships from others. Incest in Ada seems mainly to be a sexual manifestation of the characters' intellectual incestuousness, and operates on a similar plane as do other instances of "sexual transgression" in Nabokov's novels of this period, such as pedophilia in Lolita and homosexuality in Pale Fire.
In Robert Heinlein's Time Enough for Love (1973) and To Sail Beyond the Sunset (1987), characters make pro-incest arguments.
Incest and inbreeding is a frequent theme in the works of V. C. Andrews. Lizzy Goodman of The Guardian cites the incest, among other dark themes, as "a shocking but necessary" way to explore the darker aspects of life.
Anne Rice's Mayfair trilogy (1990–94) deals with a family of witches who are heavily inbred.  Amid controversy, Rice stated that her novels recognized the agency of young women and their freedom to choose lovers. One character fathers children with his sister, daughter, and granddaughter.
V.C. Andrews's (see above) "Dollanganger" novels depict a highly dysfunctional family dynamic with clearly incestuous origins. In Flowers in the Attic, Corrine reveals to her children that their father, Christopher Sr. is her half-uncle. Later, Chris Jr. has sex with his sister, Cathy. In the sequel, Petals on the Wind, Cathy is pregnant with Chris's child and has a miscarriage. At the end of the book, they run away together and get married. In the prequel, Garden of Shadows, Malcolm rapes his step-mother, Alicia, resulting in the pregnancy that produced Corrine. Malcolm pays Alicia to move away with her son/his half-brother and leave Corrine. Several years later, Alicia dies, and her son, Christopher Sr. comes to stay. It is then that he meets Corrine, who he thinks is his half-niece but does not know is his half-sister. They fall in love, and later run away together, get married and have four children. To a lesser degree, this dynamic also manifests itself in the remaining two Dollanganger novels, If There Be Thorns and Seeds of Yesterday.
 A Song of Ice and Fire contains numerous examples of this (see also twincest in fiction below):
 The Targaryen dynasty that ruled the Seven Kingdoms before the series begins often practised incestuous marriages in the tradition of Old Valyria to keep their bloodline pure. These included the first Targaryen King Aegon, who married both his sisters, and the last Targaryen King, Aerys II, the Mad King, who was also the result of a brother-sister marriage between Jaehaerys II and Shaera. 
 In The Rogue Prince and The Princess and the Queen, one of the main characters Aegon II is married to his full sister Helaena. His half-sister Rhaenyra marries her uncle Daemon Targaryen.
 The Wildling Craster marries his daughters, and even marries the daughters they produce.
 Euron Greyjoy is revealed to have raped his youngest full brothers, Aeron and Urrigon, when they were children.
In J.K. Rowling's Harry Potter series, the main antagonist Lord Voldemort is a descendant of the Gaunt family which is known for marrying their cousins.

Sibling incest in fiction

Fantasy fiction 
In The Mists of Avalon (1983) by Marion Zimmer Bradley, half siblings Arthur and Morgaine engage in sexual intercourse during a religious ritual and then again the morning afterwards, which leads to the conception of Mordred. After Morgaine finds out that they are siblings, she that during Arthur's wedding ceremony to Gwenhwyfar, that Gwenhwyfar is looking at Lancelet while Arthur is looking at man who claimed to have the same father as her. Morgaine has an unrequited love for Lancelet, her half-first cousin (their mothers are half-sisters) and the two share an intimate moment. Morgaine also has an affair with her stepson Accolon and is almost raped by Accolon's older brother. It is also strongly implied that Lancelet harbors homosexual feelings for Arthur, which he believes may be the reason for his attraction to Arthur's wife.  The three of them even share an intimate moment.
The historical fantasy novel Teito Monogatari (1985–89) by Hiroshi Aramata features a subplot involving incest. The minister of finance copulates with his sister, producing a daughter; an act which foils the efforts of the protagonist Yasunori Kato.
In the Elenium trilogy (1989–92) by David Eddings, Queen Ehlana's widowed father Aldreas carried on an incestuous affair with his sister, Princess Arissa. She had initially seduced him in their youth with the intent of getting him to marry her, as one of the advisors had found an obscure law which would permit it, but was thwarted by the hero's father. The affair resumed after the death of Ehlana's mother and continued until the King's death, at which time Arissa was confined to a convent.
In J. R. R. Tolkien's The Children of Húrin (2007), the characters Túrin and Nienor, who are brother and sister, unwittingly enter into an incestuous marriage when they meet for the first time while Nienor has had her memories taken by the dragon Glaurung. After Nienor falls pregnant, Glaurung restores her memory and she and her brother kill themselves in grief. This is a development of the story explored more briefly in Tolkien's The Silmarillion, Unfinished Tales and Book of Lost Tales, all of which included versions of the tale. The story is based on that of Kullervo from the Kalevala.

Science-fiction 
Incest also appears in the writings of several major authors of science fiction. 
Robert A. Heinlein wrote several stories in which a culture has normalized incest: Methuselah's Children (novel, 1941), Time for the Stars (novel, 1956), "—All You Zombies—" (short story, 1958), Farnham's Freehold (novel, 1964), Time Enough For Love (novel, 1973), The Number of the Beast (novel, 1980). 
Ursula K. Le Guin's short story "Nine Lives" (1969) features ten clones (five male, five female) of the same person, whose intimate relationship includes incest. Her novel The Left Hand of Darkness (1969) contains a story of two siblings who mate, despite a taboo against it.
In Philip K. Dick's novel, Flow My Tears, the Policeman Said (1974), Police General Felix Buckman is in a sexual relationship with his sister.
In Piers Anthony's Bio of a Space Tyrant (from 1983), the main character's sister has sex with him when he is 15 and she is 12.
In Isaac Asimov's novel, The Robots of Dawn (1983), on the planet Aurora, family ties are generally not considered important, and incest between a parent and an adult child is considered customary where that family tie is known to them.

Historic fiction 
 The Mahavamsa "Great Chronicle", Pali Mahāvaṃsa  (5th century CE) is the meticulously kept historical chronicle of Sri Lanka written in the style of an epic poem written in the Pali language.[1] It relates the history of Sri Lanka from its legendary beginnings up to the reign of Mahasena of Anuradhapura (A.D. 302) covering the period between the arrival of Prince Vijaya from India in 543 BCE to his reign (277–304 CE) and later updated by different writers. 
Thomas Mann's The Holy Sinner (1951) explores the spiritual consequences of unintentional incest. His short story "The Blood of the Walsungs" also depicts brother-sister incest, drawing explicitly on Wagner's Siegmund and Sieglinde.
Carolyn Slaughter's 1976 novel The Story of the Weasel (also known as Relations in the US) concerns an incestuous relationship between the protagonist, Cathy, and her older brother Christopher, during the 1880s. 
The novel Aztec (1980) by Gary Jennings contains a subplot that portrays the sexual relationship between the main character Mixtli and his older sister Tzitzitlini, which they manage to keep secret from their parents and the rest of their society- that would have punished them with death- for years, since their late childhood until their adolescence, when circumstances separate them and cause her death. He pines for her for many years afterwards. He later fathers a daughter with his wife and, after the deaths of both his wife and child, he reveals during sexual intercourse with the character Malinche, that his attraction to her was caused by her physical resemblance to his own late daughter, who would have been the same age as Malinche at that point of the story.
In two books of Philippa Gregory's Wideacre Trilogy, Wideacre (1987) and The Favored Child (1989), the central female character of Wideacre, Beatrice, commits incest with her brother, Harry, and her two children, Julia and Richard, were fathered by Harry. In The Favored Child, Richard rapes Julia and forces her to marry him when she discovers that she is pregnant with his child, Sarah (or Meridon). Philippa Gregory also insinuates incest between siblings in her novel The Other Boleyn Girl. It seems that George Boleyn has had some level of sexual relationship with both of his sisters, Anne and Mary.
At the end of A. S. Byatt's novella Morpho Eugenia (1992), a Victorian naturalist—recently married into an aristocratic family—discovers the ongoing affair between his languid, alluring wife and her brother.
Ken Follett's 1989 novel The Pillars of the Earth and the eventual mini-series with the same title both depict the incestuous relationship between Lady Regan and her son William Hamleigh.
 In Os Maias ("The Maias") (1888), a realist novel by Portuguese author José Maria de Eça de Queiroz, brother and sister are separated at an early age, with the brother staying in Lisbon and the sister ending up in Paris, with the brother believing her dead. They fall in love when the sister returns to Lisbon, only discovering that they are siblings by accident when a friend of the sister when she was a child in Paris visits Lisbon.
In Mario Puzo's The Family (Puzo novel) Lucrezia Borgia loses her virginity to her brother Cesare.
Cormac McCarthy's novel Outer Dark (1968) centers on an incestuous sister and brother.

Contemporary fiction 
Liza and Ludwig Pursewarden in Lawrence Durrell's The Alexandria Quartet (1957–60) are sister and brother. They have a long sexual relationship until she marries a man called David Mountolive.
In Ian McEwan's 1978 novel The Cement Garden, the tension between the protagonist Jack and his older sister Julie culminates in incest. 
John Irving's 1981 novel The Hotel New Hampshire chronicles the lives of the Berry family. Two of the Berry siblings, John and Franny, share a closeness that develops into an incestuous encounter when they are adults.
In Penelope Lively's 1987 novel Moon Tiger, the main character Claudia Hampton reveals to the reader that she had an incestuous relationship with her brother Gordon while both were in their late teens.
Banana Yoshimoto's 1990 novel NP presents multiple incestuous relationships. The narrator and protagonist, Kazami, attempts a translation to Japanese of a series of many stories written in English by the writer Sarao Takase, who commits suicide after finishing the ninety-eighth story of his volume, after her boyfriend Shouji himself commits suicide after trying to translate the last story himself. Kazami meets the twins brother and sister Otohiko and Saki and their acquaintance Sui. Upon reaching the last story, Kazami discovers that Sui was actually Takase's daughter with a prostitute and he has sexual relations with her, which is the reason he determined him to kill himself. Kazami also discovers that Sui has an incestuous relationship with her step-brother Otohiko, all the while Kazami finds herself irresistibly attracted to Sui.
Edna O'Brien' short story collection Lantern Slides has a short story entitled "Brother" involving incest between a brother and sister.
The Josephine Hart 1991 novel Damage (and 1992 Louis Malle film) has an implicit depiction of incest. The character Anna (portrayed by Juliette Binoche) alludes to having had an incestuous relationship with her brother, who commits suicide because of his desire for her.
In James Ellroy's 1992 novel White Jazz, the main character David Klein has an incestuous relationship with his sister Meg.
Helen Dunmore's A Spell of Winter (1995) centers around the story of orphans Catherine and Rob Allen, who grow up in the bleak, desolate environment of their grandfather's country manor and whose relationship eventually evolves into a sexual one.
Carlos Ruiz Zafón's novel The Shadow of the Wind (2001) features main characters Julián Carax and Penélope Aldaya who are siblings and also lovers. After a sexual encounter it is revealed that Penelope produces a child later named David. She is callously left to die by her father and mother whilst giving birth to her son due to her parents' disgust and shame.
The intersex narrator of Jeffrey Eugenides' Middlesex (2002) traces their condition to a rare recessive gene which they inherited from their grandparents, a brother and sister who fled Greece for Detroit, Michigan when the Turkish army invaded in 1922.

Young-adult fiction 
In Sonya Hartnett's Sleeping Dogs (1995), a brother and sister's incest is only one symptom of the family's degradation.
Francesca Lia Block's Wasteland (2003) features the incestuous relationship of a teenage brother and sister.
In the young-adult series "Blue Bloods" (from 2006) by Melissa de la Cruz, which features vampires reincarnated every lifetime and couples who are "bonded" and find each other every lifetime, two of the semi-main characters, who are a bonded couple, are twins.
In Cassandra Clare's Mortal Instruments series (2007-2014), the two main characters Clary and Jace enter into a relationship then realise they are siblings. They are then revealed not to be siblings. Also, Clary's real brother, Sebastian, has sexual feelings for her, they share a kiss and he wants to take the relationship further.
In Tabitha Suzuma's Forbidden (2010), teenage siblings Lochlyn and Maya are forced to raise their younger siblings after being abandoned by their father and neglected by their mother, and they fall in love with other, which ends with tragic consequences.

Incest involving twins
In Donna Tartt's novel 1992 The Secret History, the characters Charles and Camilla Macaulay are fraternal twins who, it is revealed, have a sexual incestuous relationship. Though Charles later becomes abusive towards Camilla, the romantic/sexual side of their relationship is not explicitly condemned by the narrator.
In Richard Wagner's Der Ring des Nibelungen (1813–83), the hero Siegfried is the son of the incestuous relationship between twins Siegmund and Sieglinde.
 Incest between twins plays an influential role in George R. R. Martin's bestselling fantasy series A Song of Ice and Fire (from 1996). The television adaptation, Game of Thrones, controversially adapted several scenes to be non-consensual, which led some critics to label the changes as overly exploitative and an attempt to court controversy. The TV show features Cersei Lannister having sex with her twin brother Jaime Lannister, and they had children together while Cersei Lannister was queen. An investigation brings this to light; however, King Robert Baratheon dies before finding his wife's children are illegitimate, beginning a civil war.

Non-consensual sibling incest 
In Matthew Gregory Lewis's Gothic novel, The Monk, published in 1796, the protagonist, Ambrosio, lusts after and eventually rapes the girl, Antonia, who he later discovers to be his sister.
Judith Krantz's 1980 novel Princess Daisy contains some rather graphic scenes of a woman being raped by her half-brother.
In E. Annie Proulx's 1993 novel The Shipping News and the 2001 film adaptation of the same name, it is explained that Agnis Hamm was once raped by her teenage half-brother when she was twelve, resulting in a pregnancy which was terminated.

Parent-children incest in fiction
The 1959 novel The Manchurian Candidate (and less explicitly in the two film adaptations based upon it) portrays incest between Eleanor Iselin and her son Raymond and refers to earlier incest between Eleanor and her own father.

Father/daughter incest
Incest plays a central role in Theodore Sturgeon's short story "If All Men Were Brothers, Would You Let One Marry Your Sister?" (1967), in which the main character visits a world in which it is actively encouraged, and which is a utopia as a result. Sturgeon's afterword in Dangerous Visions, where it was originally published, indicates that he is not arguing for incest per se, merely demonstrating the manner in which a culture absorbs certain 'truths' without questioning them.
Pier Paolo Pasolini's 1975 film Salò, or the 120 Days of Sodom, a loose adaptation of the Marquis de Sade's aforementioned The 120 Days of Sodom, is full of father-daughter incest.
In George Wilkins's and William Shakespeare's plays Pericles, Prince of Tyre, Antiochus, king of Antioch, is engaged in an incestuous relationship with his daughter, a fact correctly interpreted by the play's titular character.
In F. Scott Fitzgerald's novel Tender Is the Night (1934), the character Nicole Diver eventually has a nervous breakdown as a result of an incestuous relationship with her father.
Ralph Ellison's Invisible Man (1952) also deals with incest. The main character, at one point in the novel, comes into contact with a family in which the daughter has been impregnated by the father.
In Homo Faber (1957) by Max Frisch, the main character Walter Faber falls in love and has a sexual relationship with Sabeth, who he discovers, in the final part of the novel, is his daughter, from his young, witless relationship with art student Hanna. 
The central theme of Deborah Moggach's 1983 novel Porky is the abuse by a father of his daughter from the age of 11 and the impact this has on her later life.
Dick Crick, one of the main characters in Graham Swift's 1983 novel Waterland is the son of his mother and grandfather.
In a later novel of John Irving, The Cider House Rules (1985), the chief picker of the apple crop, Mr. Rose, has an incestuous relationship with his daughter, Rose Rose, and even makes her pregnant.
In her novel Mathilda,  Mary Shelley, (1959), tells the story of an unnamed father's reunion and unconsummated incestuous love for his daughter.
In Poppy Z Brite's 1992 novel Lost Souls there are two incidences of adult/child incest. Wallace Creech sleeps with his young adult daughter Jessy and vampire, Zillah, has a deeply sexual relationship with his son, Nothing.
The Korean thriller Oldboy has father/daughter incest as one of its main plot points.
In the 2004 novel, Fall on Your Knees, the Piper family patriarch, James, grows obsessed with his eldest daughter Kathleen that turns sexual. When he learns of her affair with another woman, he rapes her, resulting in her dying while giving birth to a daughter named Lily.
C.E. Morgan's 2016 The Sport of Kings includes incest between a white man Henry Forge and his daughter, Henrietta. The incest and resulting pregnancy are part of the novel's reflection on race.
 Carolivia Herron's Thereafter Johnnie centers on an African-American family in a postapocalyptic "Washington City." John Christopher has a sexual relationship with one of his daughters, Patricia, resulting in the birth of their daughter, Johnnie. Johnnie is mute for the first 14 years of her life, and Patricia commits suicide.
The 2021 book Incubus Summerhouse by Michelle Moffat features an incestuous relationship between a father and daughter. 
In story 'Why I Stay Silent' in the 2021 book 'The Entrance to Hell and Other Gothic Stories' by Michelle Moffat, an adult woman describes the incestuous relationship she had with her adoptive Father during her childhood.

Sexual abuse
In Sidney Sheldon's Tell Me Your Dreams (1998), the central character, Ashley Patterson, had been sexually abused by her father, because of which she develops multiple personality disorder.
Toni Morrison's The Bluest Eye (1970) echoes Ellison's work in its portrayal of father-daughter incest, which, like in Invisible Man, is portrayed not as consensual incest but as child molestation.
Jessie is the central character in Stephen King's 1992 novel Gerald's Game. She is sexually abused by her father at the age of 10.
In both Sapphire's debut novel Push (1996) and Precious, the film starring Gabourey Sidibe that was based on it, the main character, Precious, has two children with her own father. She is also sexually abused by her mother.
In Sharon M. Draper's 1997 novel Forged By Fire, a character, Angel, is constantly molested by her father, who is also Gerald's stepfather. Gerald and Angel's mother refuses to listen to them, as she pays more attention to Jordan than her children.
 Edith Wharton's draft for an unpublished short story Beatrice Palmato (c. 1919) is an explicitly pornographic account of a father's rape of his daughter.
 In Alice Walker's Pulitzer Prize-winning novel The Color Purple, a poor African American woman named Celie Harris is sexually abused from a young age by her father, Alphonso "James" Harris. By age 14, this resulted in her having two children by him, both of whom Celie has taken away from her by him at childbirth. Her father eventually forces her to marry a wealthy young local widower named Albert Johnson, known to her only as "Mister," who physically and sexually abuses Celie, treating her like a slave.

Father/son incest

Sexual abuse
Cameron Miller is aged 14 in Counterfeit Son (2000), written by Elaine Marie Alphin. He has been sexually abused all his life by his father, a serial killer of more than 20 young boys. 
In Jim Grimsley's Dream Boy, the adolescent Nathan is sexually abused by his drunken father and it is clear that his mother knows, but does nothing.

Mother/son incest
Incest is a major element of the Sophocles play Oedipus Rex, based on the story from Greek mythology, in which the title character unknowingly kills his father and marries his mother. This act came to great prominence in the 20th century with Freud's analysis of the Oedipus complex as lying beneath the psychology of all men. Its female counterpart is called the Electra complex. Incest also plays a major role in the sequel to Oedipus, Antigone, which revolves around the lives of the four children produced by Oedipus and his mother. The main figure is their oldest daughter, Antigone, who believes she and her siblings are cursed because of their parents. Also, Antigone is engaged to her first cousin once removed, Haemon (which was, however, not considered incestuous in the culture of the time, nor is it today in other parts of the world).
In One Person (2012) by John Irving has mother-son incest. The mother-son incest was a failed attempt at preventing a genetic male with gender dysphoria from wanting to do a male-to-female gender transition. The son ended up transitioning anyway.
My Mother (1966) by George Bataille is a coming-of-age story leading to a mother/son relationship. Christophe Honore's film Ma Mère is loosely based on the book.
In Chthon, a Nebula and Hugo nominated 1967 sci-fi novel by Piers Anthony, the main character Aton Five falls for and eventually wins the love of Malice, a woman he discovers to be his mother only after she first seduces him, but before they become an item.
In Richard Condon's novel The Manchurian Candidate, brainwashed Raymond Shaw has sex with his mother while under a hypnotic trance (this does not feature in either the 1962 or 2004 film adaptations). 
Pete Hamill's 1977 novel Flesh and Blood deals with mother-son incest and its consequences for both. It is believed to have directly inspired the Taboo series of adult films.
In The Tragedy of the Street of Flowers (Portuguese: A Tragédia da Rua das Flores), by José Maria de Eça de Queirós (1845 - 1900), written in the 1870s but only published in 1980, a young mother who had deserted her husband and baby son meets and falls in love with the boy, without knowing who he is, when he is 23. On discovering his identity, she commits suicide.

Sexual abuse
In Incendies, a 2010 French-Canadian film about twin siblings travelling to Lebanon to find their brother and father in obedience to their late mother's will, the twins discover that they are the product of incest between their mother and a son she had in 1970, who raped her aged 18 when she was in prison for murder of a Christian far-right militant. They then give the two envelopes their mother has prepared (labelled "to the father" and "to the son" in French) to the same man after finding him in their own country under an assumed identity.
In The Heart Is Deceitful Above All Things (2001) by JT LeRoy, five-year-old Jeremiah is physically and sexually abused by his prostitute mother.

Other adult/child incest in fiction
One of the main plots of Chuck Palahniuk's novel Rant features the possibility of time travel combined with incest. By replacing one's own father, grandfather and great-grandfather by the means of time travel, one might purify one's own genetic material to a great extent. The main character, who is assumably the product of such a process, has for example, a largely extended ability to smell, increased perception and has also an increased ability to deal with pain and poisoning.
Two of Robert A. Heinlein's novel have incest content. In Time for the Stars, Tom Bartlett returns from his relativistic space travels to marry his great grand niece, having known her telepathically since she was a baby. In Glory Road, a mother and her daughters (18 and 13 years old) offer their sexual favors to the protagonist —the more of them he accepts, by their cultural standards, the more he honors them —but, bound by his own Earthly inhibitions, he does them the dishonor of refusing their offer.
The novel, First Love: A Gothic Tale by Joyce Carol Oates, portrays the abusive/sexual relationship 11-year-old Josie has with her adult cousin, Jared. The psychological and physical abuse she receives from her mother and aunt makes her believe that Jared's sexual abuse is a form of him expressing his love to her.
Incest appears in many of William Faulkner's works, either enacted or imagined.  Examples include Go Down, Moses, The Sound and the Fury and Sanctuary.

Comic books
In the Planetary comic book series by Warren Ellis and John Cassaday, Doc Brass was the result of a eugenics experiment that went all the way back to the French Revolution. In issue #5, 'The Good Doctor,' it is revealed that his parents were siblings.
In the Alan Moore graphic novel Lost Girls, incest plays a prominent part in the re-telling of the stories of Wendy Darling and her brothers from Peter Pan and Dorothy Gale and her "uncle" (actually her father) from The Wonderful Wizard of Oz.
In the Marvel book The Ultimates, the characters the Scarlet Witch and Quicksilver shared an incestuous relationship together until she was shot by a bullet tracking her D.N.A. in a plot orchestrated by Doctor Doom.
 In Elektra: Assassin #1 (August 1986), the adult Elektra Natchios has vague memories of being raped by her father as a five-year-old. Years of counseling and medication had convinced her this was a false memory, but the doubt remained.

Japanese manga and anime
Incest has been a recurring subject in Japanese manga such as Osamu Tezuka's Ayako (1972–1973). Incest has also been a subject in Japanese anime, dating all the way back to one of the medium's earliest pornographic titles, Cream Lemon. Sibling incest is the most common manifestation.

Cousin coupling is very common in anime, because cousin marriages in Japan are not incestuous but, on the contrary, they are actually seen as desirable.

Several kinds of incest
The popular anime Tenchi Muyo! has several instances of incest, which are seen as normal.
 Ayeka, one of the main characters, was once engaged to her half-brother, Yosho. On Ayeka's planet, such a thing is not considered bad. In fact, she comes to Earth looking for him. She is later shown to have feelings for Yosho's grandson Tenchi, who is technically her grandnephew.
 In the Tenchi Muyo! Ryo-Ohki continuity, Tenchi's parents, Nobuyuki and late Kiyone, were also related.
 The great-grandparents of main character Mihoshi Kuramitsu were step-siblings.

In Kotono Katō's Altair: A Record of Battles manga, Ayşe, a supporting character, has unrequited romantic feelings for her maternal uncle, Beyazit.

Sibling incest

Shojo manga author Kaori Yuki has used this theme twice:
 In Godchild, the protagonist, Cain Hargreaves, is the product of the incestuous union of his father and his father's older sister, inheriting gold-green eyes and the curse of being unable to love anyone who was not blood related to him. Cain also has a love interest in his half-sister/cousin who does not return his feelings. 
 In Angel Sanctuary, she uses incest as a necessary plot device. Setsuna Mudo is in love with his sister, Sara, who returns his feelings. As it turns out, Setsuna is the reincarnation of the angel Alexiel, who long ago was punished to be reincarnated as a human, while Sara is in fact Jibril, the Angel of Water. They are so determined to stay together that they willingly abandon their family and future without a second thought and Setsuna searches relentlessly in Hell for Sara's soul.

In the anime and manga franchise Vampire Knight, pure-blooded vampires often marry siblings to keep their bloodline pure – Yuki Cross's parents were siblings, and it was stated that she was "born" to be Kaname's (her older brother) wife.

In Maze, Mei and her brother, Akira, had an incestuous encounter when they were young and this led him to being viewed as an outcast by their parents. However, they are still in love with each other and remain together, despite their love being a taboo.

In the light novel, visual novel, and anime Oreimo, siblings Kyousuke and Kirino are a pair of teenage otaku who gradually fall in love with each other and maintain a sexual relationship in secret from their parents, against the objections of all their friends and in defiance of the conventions of society.

In the manga Aki Sora, Aki is in love with her little brother, Sora, and is later able to persuade him into a sexual relationship, though he often considers breaking it off due to the fact he cannot see a future with this relationship. In the final chapter, they compromise and end their forbidden relationship. Later on in the manga he is repeatedly forced to have sex with his twin sister Nami. It is later discovered that their parents had been brother and sister.

In the manga True Love, siblings Yuzuru and Ai were separated for 10 years after their parents’ divorce. But, after reuniting, they begin to fall in love and have a secret relationship, against the objections of their mother and friends. They later find out they are not biologically related as he was adopted and they get married.

In the Tokyo Ghoul series written by Sui Ishida, one of the main antagonists, Kichimura Washū, is in love with his half-sister, Rize Kamishiro: he had helped her escape from the Sunlit Garden, but she turned him down. Kichimura begun stalking her and in the prologue, threw multiple steel beams on Rize in a construction area after she was seen with the protagonist, Ken Kaneki, thus resulting in the latter becoming a ghoul, setting the story in motion. In the later part of the series, Kichimura stated wanting to "share a bunch of kids" with Rize; their relationship in the anime was briefly seen and the incest part was only implied in the final episode.

Incest involving twins
Certain anime programs, such as Koi Kaze and Please Twins!, are serious, even sympathetic, studies of the characters as they struggle with their emotions and societal taboos. In Please Twins! this is because both girls fell in love with the protagonist, despite knowing that either of them could be his biological twin sister.

In the shojo manga Boku wa Imōto ni Koi o Suru, Yori and Iku are twin brother and sister who have been extremely close all their lives and who now begin to fall in love with each other and have to face the consequences of it. It is later revealed that they are half-twins due to them being the product of a heteropaternal superfecundation (they have different fathers). At the end, Yori attempts to separate from her for 10 years but when he and Iku reunite, he says that he still loves her and it is hinted that they have resumed their relationship.

In the visual novel and anime Yosuga no Sora, Sora has feelings for her twin brother, Haru, ever since they were kids. After their parents died, they moved back to the old house and Sora has been keeping her feelings suppressed while she fantasizes being with him. In episode 11 and 12, they had opened themselves to their feelings and decide to abandon their friends and home to be together.

Parental incest
In the series Kaze to Ki no Uta, Gilbert is physically, emotionally, and sexually abused by his father, Auguste, who poses as his uncle. Auguste, who is interested in making Gilbert as his own personal pet, can be kind to Gilbert at one time and then be cruel in another. His influence is so strong that Gilbert actually believes they are in love; this ultimately has tragic consequences for Gilbert's relationship with Serge.

Papa to Kiss in the Dark centers around a 15-year-old boy having an incestuous relationship with his father, who is later revealed to be his uncle.

In Tokyo Ghoul, CCG's chairman and ghoul Tsuneyoshi Washū plans to rape his daughter Rize Kamishiro in order to "preserve" the pure ghoul Washū family; also, he is a serial rapist of human women, resulting in the birth of half-human illegitimate Washū members.

See also
Incest in popular culture
Incest in film and television
Incest in the Bible
Incest in folklore
Incest pornography

References

Incest in fiction
Literature by topic